Fenn Tower is a 22-story skyscraper in Cleveland, Ohio. It is owned by Cleveland State University. It was built for the National Town and Country Club, but was only used for one event before closing. It was originally known as the National Town and Country Club before being sold. It was purchased by Fenn College in 1937 for $250,000. It is currently being used as student housing. It is the second tallest structure on the Cleveland State campus, second to Rhodes Tower. The tower was named after Sereno Peck Fenn (one of three principal founders of Sherwin-Williams), whom Fenn College was named after. Fenn Tower is listed on the National Register of Historic Places as the National Town and Country Club. It was originally furnished by Rorimer-Brooks Studios, Inc. Originally where the Fenn Gym and The Ellwood H. Fisher Swimming Pool were located, they were removed during the 2005 renovation.

History
Fenn started by offering night classes in the 1930s in engineering and its model was to specialize in low cost higher education. Fenn's first president was Dr. Cecil V. Thomas who was a well known academician and Ohio educator. In 1932, Fenn added business classes to the growing roster of student programs. The National Town and Country Club Building was supposed to house the gentleman's club for Greater Clevelanders who wanted a central location in which to hold club meetings and events.
  However, due to the stock market crash in 1929, the club was no longer solvent and  the high rise building lay vacant until purchased by Fenn College in 1937 because of Fenn's need for more space. This meant that Fenn was only the third college in the United States to have a skyscraper on its academic campus (the others being the University of Pittsburgh and Thomas Jefferson University in Philadelphia) and further gave Fenn a much more coveted Euclid Avenue downtown address. In 1940, Fenn became accredited by the North Central Association of Colleges and Secondary Schools. It is noteworthy that throughout its history Fenn never operated at a loss until 1963 when increasing financial pressures forced it into a deal to become part of the new public Cleveland State University.

See also
Cleveland State University 
List of tallest buildings in Cleveland

References

External links

Official Fenn Tower website

Cleveland State University
Residential skyscrapers in Cleveland
Buildings and structures completed in 1929
Art Deco architecture in Ohio
National Register of Historic Places in Cleveland, Ohio